Luke Wiles (born August 28, 1982) is a Canadian lacrosse player who plays forward for the Philadelphia Wings of the National Lacrosse League. Wiles was named to the 2006 NLL All-Rookie Team.

Junior career
Wiles had an outstanding junior career over six years with the Orillia Rama Kings and the St. Catharines Athletics. For two straight years (2001–2002), Wiles led the league in scoring. In 2003, he led the Athletics to a Minto Cup National championship, and took home tournament M.V.P honours. He finished his career 404 points in just 108 games, and is currently 53rd all time in Canadian Junior A lacrosse for career goals (regular season and playoffs combined) with 259.

Statistics

NLL
Reference:

Canadian Lacrosse Association

References

1982 births
Living people
Buffalo Bandits players
Canadian lacrosse players
Lacrosse people from Ontario
Major League Lacrosse players
People from Orillia
Philadelphia Wings players
San Jose Stealth players
Toronto Rock players
Washington Stealth players